Eleanor ("Ellie") Foraker (September 2, 1930 - December 8, 2011) was an American seamstress who worked at the International Latex Corporation (ILC) and was involved in NASA's space program. She left the Playtex division of ILC Dover in 1964 and worked on underground inflatable oil tanks and gas masks to aid the development of the A7L spacesuit for the Apollo 11 mission. Her last contribution at NASA before retirement was with the Pathfinder Mission, where she worked on stitching together the airbag system that was used to land the Sojourner rover on Mars.

Early career 
Foraker was born September 2, 1930, in Kenton, Delaware. She worked at ILC Dover for 43 years, collaborating on projects in a seamstress and managerial capacity. When ILC competed for a contract to design and create a spacesuit for the Apollo missions, Foraker was invited to join the team. In 1964 she moved from sewing cloth diaper covers to sewing Apollo-mission spacesuits. From 1968 to 1974, she continued as a supervisor and manager at ILC.

Apollo mission 

Foraker's contributions to the development of Apollo's A7L spacesuit for the Apollo program is arguably her most notable contribution at ILC. Designed by seamstresses and engineers of ILC, it differed significantly from suit designs put for bid in competing RFPs. Designs by seamstresses in the Playtex division resulted in a spacesuit with a 21-layer design, sewn and glued together. Its softness and flexibility were in stark contrast to the rigid suits put forth by competing military designers and engineers. The spacesuit had to be able to withstand immensely cold and hot temperatures, be flame resistant, and protect the wearer from harmful atmospheric conditions. They needed to have a seam allowance of less than one sixty-fourth of an inch. 

The suits had to have an impermeable rubber bladder, a misplaced hole, or pin left hidden in the fabric was a serious safety issue. that the suits were x-rayed to double-check that no pins had been left in the work. One of Foraker's tasks in her supervisory role was managing the use of sewing pins by the seamstresses. Each seamstress was given a set of pins with different colored heads so that Foraker could track who worked on each suit. Anecdotally, If a pin was found in the suit, it would typically result in a pin poke to the behind.

Work culture 
There was reportedly collaboration, teamwork and respect between the seamstresses and engineers who were working on the suits. More seamstresses like Foraker had been brought over to the project from the Playtex division (all of whom were women), and were encouraged to share their expertise and knowledge by teaching the engineers how to sew, and suggesting ways to improve the suits as they worked on them. The respect for the work that the seamstresses were doing was integral to creating a properly functioning suit and was exhibited especially by the project head of the suit development, Leonard (Lenny) Sheperd. During the final stages of the production of the suits, Sheperd would stay at the Dover plant with Foraker for many late nights and help move the bulky suits as she sewed them using one of the two modified singer sewing machines (dubbed 'Big Moe' and 'Sweet Sue'). At this time Foraker was also undertaking a supervisory role, and working eighty-hour workweeks, sometimes only leaving the plant for two hours before coming back. Foraker's dedication to the creation of the spacesuit meant that aside from these long work weeks, she had no days off or vacations for three years, and also ended up suffering two nervous breakdowns during this time.

Lasting impact 
The softer and more flexible A7L spacesuit became the template for future spacesuit designs. The work that Foraker and the team of seamstresses did is significant in the ways in which it remained largely unacknowledged. This can be understood by looking at the ways in which 'women's work' in general, but specifically sewing with its links to the domestic sphere, has historically been devalued, underpaid, and obfuscated as 'real work'. The incredible amount of time, skills and knowledge that these women contributed in sewing these suits helps to shed light on these realities and re-situate this work as such that is highly skilled and valuable. Among the names known and valorized for their connection to the Apollo missions, the work of the seamstresses and Foraker had remained mostly hidden until the 21st century when this started to shift. The widely acclaimed book-based movie Hidden Figures, which follows the lives of three Black women mathematicians working at NASA during the space race, exemplifies this push to acknowledge the important contributions that women have made in the past century that have remained relatively hidden. The book, Spacesuit: Fashioning Apollo, published in 2011, details the incredible amount of work that went into the making of the A7L spacesuit, and acknowledges how integral the team of seamstresses were in the suit coming together. While no movie has yet been released, in 2013 Warner Bros. had had plans to adapt this book into film, hiring Richard Cordiner to write the script for it. Inspired by the real events of Foraker's life, a children's book entitled The spacesuit: how a seamstress helped put a man on the moon, was published in 2019 which loosely follows her story working on the A7L spacesuit.

References

See also 
"The seamstresses who helped put a man on the moon" https://www.cbsnews.com/news/apollo-11-the-seamstresses-who-helped-put-a-man-on-the-moon/

1930 births
2011 deaths
History of women in the United States
Apollo program
American tailors
20th-century artisans